Ceantar na nOileán is an Irish-speaking district in the West of County Galway. There are about 2,000 people living in the area, located 56 km west of Galway city. 

In 2016, 71.7% (1,474) of the population aged 3 years and over spoke Irish daily outside the education system.

The islands are connected by a bridge to the mainland. The main islands are Leitir Móir, Garmna and Leitir Mealláin. The area is rich in Irish language and culture.

Economy

Tourism and fishing are the main sources of revenue.  The land is poor and the people have always had a strong bond with sea. Seaweed farming was important in the past on all of the islands especially for the production of iodine.

See also

Connemara
Aran Islands
Joyce Country
Iorras Aithneach

References

External links
 Ceantar na nOilean stats

Geography of County Galway